Kanwar Dhillon (born 15 March 1993) is an Indian actor who primarily works in Hindi television. Dhillon made his acting debut with The Buddy Project, portraying Kunal in 2012. He earned wider recognition with his portrayal of Shiva Pandya in Pandya Store. He has two Indian Television Academy Award nomination to his credit.

Dhillon's first major appearance came with Na Bole Tum Na Maine Kuch Kaha 2, where he portrayed Aditya Vyas Bhatnagar. His other notable work include portraying Vidhaan Nayak in Do Dil Ek Jaan and Arjun Singh in Piya Rangrezz. He has also portrayed episodic roles in various shows.

Early life and background 
Dhillon was born on 15 March 1993 in Mumbai, Maharashtra. Born into a Punjabi family, he is the son of actor Deep Dhillon and Radha Dhillon. Dhillon's father is a film and television actor, known for his work in Ghayal and Mahabharat. He has an elder brother named Karan Dhillon.

Career

Debut and breakthrough (2012-2015) 

Dhillon made his acting debut with The Buddy Project in 2012. He portrayed Kunal in the second season of the series.

His first major role came with his portrayal of Aditya Vyas Bhatnagar, in the second season of Na Bole Tum Na Maine Kuch Kaha in 2013. It proved as a major turning point in his career.

From 2013 to 2014, he portrayed Vidhaan Nayak in Do Dil Ek Jaan, opposite Shritama Mukherjee. In 2014, he portrayed Kartik in Yeh Hai Aashiqui, opposite Mrinalini Tyagi and portrayed Varun Lal in an episode of Halla Bol, the same year.

Dhillon portrayed Shivprasad Mishra in Hum Hain Na opposite Pratyusha Banerjee, from 2014 to 2015. In 2015, he portrayed Lucky in an episode of Pyaar Tune Kya Kiya and appeared as a Guest on Killerr Karaoke Atka Toh Latkah.

Further career and expansion (2016-2020) 
Dhillon portrayed Arjun Singh, post the leap in Piya Rangrezz from 2015 to 2016, alongside Gaurav S Bajaj and Narayani Shastri.

In 2017, he portrayed the dual role of Shiv Aggarwal and Om Aggarwal in Ek Aastha Aisi Bhee, opposite Tina Ann Philip. In the same year, he portrayed Surya in an episode of Aye Zindagi, alongside Aakanksha Singh.

In 2018, he first played for Kota Royals Rajasthan in Box Cricket League 3. He then portrayed Sangram in an episode of Laal Ishq, opposite Yashashri Masurkar.

Dhillon next portrayed Samrat Murushottam Mittal in Internet Wala Love, the same year opposite Tunisha Sharma.

In 2020, he portrayed an army officer in the music video Yaad Baarish Mein, opposite Sonal Pradhan.

Success and recent work (2021-present) 

Since March 2021, Dhillon is seen portraying Shiva Pandya in Pandya Store, opposite Alice Kaushik. The show earned him wider recognition and praises. He received ITA Award for Best Actor (Popular) nomination for his performance.

In 2021, he also hosted Star Plus's special segment Pyar Ka Pehla Nasha, as Shiva with Kaushik. It featured the top ten romantic moments of the year 2021, starring couples of Star Plus's shows.

In 2022, Dhillon reprised Shiva Pandya in the game show Ravivaar With Star Parivaar.

Personal life 
In July 2022, Dhillon revealed that he is dating his Pandya Store co-actor Alice Kaushik.

On his part, Dhillon said, " “It was a gradual process and not instant. We shared beautiful chemistry on screen, which eventually transformed into real chemistry. Unknowingly, we are similar to our characters — Shiva and Raavi. Finally, I found that there was more to our connection. Our bond strengthened when we shot through the second lockdown away from our families in Bikaner."

Health 
Dhillon suffered a leg fracture in December 2019, due to which he could not get any work during lockdown. In 2022, while shooting for Pandya Store, he suffered a shoulder injury with dislocated shoulder, fracture and muscle tear.

Filmography

Television

Special appearances

Music videos

Accolades

See also 
List of Indian television actors

References

External links 

 

Living people
1993 births
Indian male television actors
Male actors in Hindi television
21st-century Indian male actors